Cicindelidia is a genus of beetles in the family Cicindelidae, containing the following species:

 Cicindelidia abdominalis – Eastern Pinebarrens Tiger Beetle
 Cicindelidia amargosae – Great Basin Tiger Beetle
 Cicindelidia cazieri – Cazier's Tiger Beetle
 Cicindelidia floridana – Miami tiger beetle
 Cicindelidia haemorrhagica – Wetsalts Tiger Beetle
 Cicindelidia highlandensis – Highlands Tiger Beetle
 Cicindelidia hornii – Horn's Tiger Beetle
 Cicindelidia marginipennis – Cobblestone Tiger Beetle
 Cicindelidia melissa – Cicindelidia melissa
 Cicindelidia nigrocoerulea – Black Sky Tiger Beetle
 Cicindelidia obsoleta – Large Grassland Tiger Beetle
 Cicindelidia ocellata – Ocellated Tiger Beetle
 Cicindelidia politula – Limestone Tiger Beetle
 Cicindelidia punctulata – Punctured Tiger Beetle
 Cicindelidia rufiventris – Eastern Red-bellied Tiger Beetle
 Cicindelidia scabrosa – Scabrous Tiger Beetle
 Cicindelidia schauppii – Schaupp's Tiger Beetle
 Cicindelidia sedecimpunctata – Western Red-bellied Tiger Beetle
 Cicindelidia senilis – Senile Tiger Beetle
 Cicindelidia tenuisignata – Thin-lined Tiger Beetle
 Cicindelidia trifasciata – S-banded Tiger Beetle
 Cicindelidia willistoni – Williston's Tiger Beetle

References

Cicindelidae